Juan Landsberg (born 15 February 1996) is a South African cricketer. He made his Twenty20 debut for Gauteng in the 2018 Africa T20 Cup on 14 September 2018. He made his List A debut for Gauteng in the 2018–19 CSA Provincial One-Day Challenge on 7 October 2018. He made his first-class debut for Gauteng in the 2018–19 CSA 3-Day Provincial Cup on 18 October 2018.

References

External links
 

1996 births
Living people
South African cricketers
Gauteng cricketers
Place of birth missing (living people)